Luke Erickson (born December 24, 1982) is an American former professional ice hockey center who played in the Central Hockey League (CHL) and ECHL.

Playing career
Erickson started his career in the United States Hockey League (USHL) in the 2001–02 season, playing for the Lincoln Stars. In the middle of his second season with the Stars, he was traded to the Topeka Scarecrows. Luke attended Bemidji State University for four seasons beginning in 2003–04. After his college career, he signed with the Gwinnett Gladiators of the ECHL, where he played for 11 games at the remainder of the 2006–07 season.  He then signed with the Pensacola Ice Pilots of the ECHL for the 2007-2008 season and the Alaska Aces, also of the ECHL, for the 2008-2009 season.  He then signed with the Rapid City Rush of the CHL for the 2009-2010 season.  On November 12, 2010, he was traded by Rapid City to the Arizona Sundogs.

Career statistics

Awards and honors

References

External links

1982 births
Alaska Aces (ECHL) players
American men's ice hockey centers
Arizona Sundogs players
Bemidji State Beavers men's ice hockey players
Gwinnett Gladiators players
Ice hockey players from Minnesota
Lincoln Stars players
Living people
Pensacola Ice Pilots players
People from Roseau, Minnesota
Topeka ScareCrows players